Scoparia saerdabella is a moth in the family Crambidae. It was described by Osthelder in 1938. It is found in Iran.

References

Moths described in 1938
Scorparia